Aa lozanoi is a species of orchid in the genus Aa. It is native to Colombia.

References

lozanoi
Plants described in 2014